David Sharpe may refer to:

 David Sharpe (actor) (1910–1980), American actor and stunt performer
 David Sharpe (American football) (born 1995), American football player
 David Sharpe (football club chairman) (born 1991), British football club chairman
 David Sharpe (politician) (born 1946), American politician in the Vermont House of Representatives
 David Sharpe (runner) (born 1967), former British middle-distance runner 
 David Sharpe (swimmer) (born 1990), Canadian swimmer
 David Sharpe (artist) (born 1944), American artist

See also 
 David Sharp (disambiguation)